Giffin Park is a sports venue in Coorparoo, a suburb in Brisbane, Australia. It includes an Australian rules football ground.

It was formerly used by the Brisbane Lions as their secondary training venue and is used during the summer due to clashes with the Australian Cricket season. The Lions NEAFL team formerly used it as a home ground.

It has been used as a major Queensland Australian Football League venue hosting the majority of the QAFL's premier division Grand Finals in the 21st Century, including 1999-2004, 2009-2010 and 2022.

See also

 Sport in Queensland

References

Australian rules football grounds
Sports venues in Brisbane
Brisbane Lions
North East Australian Football League grounds